The 1932 Manhattan Jaspers football team was an American football team that represented Manhattan College as an independent during the 1932 college football season.  In its first season under head coach Chick Meehan, the team compiled a 6–3–2 record. On January 1, 1933, the team played in the first Palm Festival game, predecessor to the Orange Bowl, in Miami.

Schedule

References

Manhattan
Manhattan Jaspers football seasons
Manhattan Jaspers football